Edwin Chick Burleigh (November 27, 1843June 16, 1916) was an American politician who served as the 42nd Governor of Maine from 1889 to 1893. A member of the Republican Party, he went on to hold federal office, first in the United States House of Representatives for Maine's 3rd congressional district (1897–1911) and later in the United States Senate (1913–1916).

Life and career
Burleigh was born on November 27, 1843, in Linneus, Maine, the son of Caroline Peabody (Chick) and Parker Prescott Burleigh. He attended the common schools and Houlton Academy before becoming a teacher himself. He also worked as a surveyor and farmer before entering government. He served first as a clerk in the state adjutant general's office and then was clerk in the state land office at Bangor, Maine from 1870 to 1876. He moved to Augusta, Maine and became the state land agent from 1876 to 1878 and an assistant clerk in the Maine House of Representatives until 1878. He then served four years (1880–1884) in the office of the Maine State Treasurer before becoming Maine State Treasurer himself in 1884 and serving for four years. During this time he also became principal owner of the Kennebec Journal newspaper. His great grandson is currently a writer for the paper.

In 1889 he was elected the 42nd Governor of Maine, a position he held for three years subsequent. He was elected to the United States House of Representatives in 1897 to fill the vacancy caused by the death of Seth L. Milliken and served in that body for 14 years. Unsuccessful in his campaign for reelection in 1910 he returned to business for three years until he was elected to the United States Senate in 1912. He served until his death three years later in Augusta, Maine in 1916.

See also
List of United States Congress members who died in office (1900–1949)

References

Sources and external links

 The Burleigh family of Linneus
 Bio of Edwin C. Burleigh, as found in Representative Men of Maine (1893)
 Edwin C. Burleigh, late a senator from Maine, Memorial addresses delivered in the House of Representatives and Senate frontispiece 1917

1843 births
1916 deaths
Republican Party governors of Maine
People from Linneus, Maine
Republican Party United States senators from Maine
State treasurers of Maine
Ricker College alumni
Republican Party members of the United States House of Representatives from Maine
19th-century American politicians